Badugé and Vadugé are two ancestral family names used to date by Karava families of Sri Lanka. It is derived from the Tamil Vatukar.

References

Kurukula Charithaya part I, Kurukula Véndar S. F. Weerasuriya, 1960, page 48
 Dharmabandhu T. S., 1962 Kaurava Vansa Katháva,
 Kataragama, Paul Wirz,

External links 
Karava web site - Kshatriya Maha Sabha Sri Lanka

Caste system in Sri Lanka
Society of Sri Lanka